The history of gangs in South Africa goes back to the Apartheid era.
 
Many South African gangs began, and still exist, in urban areas. This includes cities like Cape Town, Port Elizabeth and Johannesburg. Cape Town has between 90 and 130 gangs with the South African Police Service stating a total estimated membership of 100,000.

The gangs in the city of eThekwini are mostly known as 'sections' and 'hostels' because of their gang culture that dates back to the early 20th century. Unlike Cape Town and Johannesburg, sections and hostels do not fight for territory. It has remained like that for decades because of the geography of the city.

History

Western Cape 
Gangs rose to prominence in South Africa as a result of the Group Areas Act, which evicted “non-white” South Africans from their homes and resettled them in rural and underdeveloped areas far from urban and economic centres. This caused an increase in poverty and unemployment in Black and Coloured communities, most notably amongst those in the Cape Province (modern day Western Cape, Northern Cape and Eastern Cape) where Coloureds were and are still the largest racial group. In the 1960s and 1970s, Coloured residents of Cape Town started forming gangs in the Cape Flats and other non-white areas. This is due to the breakdown of social control of the inner city, which caused severe unemployment, poverty  and social marginalization. Former multi-racial suburbs of Cape Town, such as District Six, were either purged of unlawful residents or demolished. The Globe is often cited as the first gang in Cape Town but started as a neighborhood watch in District Six.

In 2013, 12% of the 2,580 murders in the Western Cape were gang-related, which was an 86% increase from 2012. Children as young as the age of 14 were arrested on gang-related murder charges. In 2019, 900 people have been murdered in the first half of the year in communities in the Cape Flats in the Western Cape; by 2022 it was reported that the Black Axes gang had started operating in Cape Town.

KwaZulu-Natal Five Factions 
It is home to the number gangs, hostel organizations, section organizations, taxi organizations and izigodi. In the province of KwaZulu-Natal gangs has put themselves in a situation where their regarded more as just neighbourhoods rather than gangs. Sections and Hostels were built by the Apartheid government as part of the Group Areas Act, except for Izigodi which has been there for centuries across KwaZulu-Natal. Hostels are more politically influenced and were involved in wars for political power during the 80s-2000s. The oldest sections/hostels date back to the early 1900s such as Dalton Hostel built in 1934. Hostels around Gauteng are connected to those in KwaZulu-Natal due to their heavy Zulu presence. Many people who occupied those hostels were Zulu people who fought under Inkatha Freedom Party during the 90s.

Rest of South Africa 
In Johannesburg in the mid-1950s and early 1960s, many Black African communities were relocated and resettled, in Soweto in the Meadowlands and Diepkloof. Lenasia and Laudium became the hub of South Africa's most notorious yet secretive mafia family globally known as RFMO (Rasool Family Mafia Organisation) originally from Pietersburg (now Polokwane) sanctuary of the infamous SAMA (South African Mafia Association) founded by Goolam Rasool (aka Moonshie) in the early 1900s. Also in Gauteng is one of the most ruthless and globally connected mafias in South Africa known as "The Sysue Mafia" or popularly known as "The Angels" they are known to attack those who attack innocent civilians they are known to be the adjudicators of the underworld. Western Soweto complained of severe crime and juvenile delinquency during the 1960s.

By the early 1960s, gang violence had escalated, which was counteracted by more policing and patrolling of non-white areas.

Typology 

The Safety Lab has identified four distinct categories that Cape Town based gangs can be divided into: Street gangs, Crews, Cliques, and Prison gangs.

Street gangs 
The largest and best known gang type in Cape Town are the street gangs that are mostly associated with poorer Coloured communities.  They tend to have hierarchical command structures and are thought to derive most of their income from the illicit drug trade.  In Cape Town, the two largest gangs are The Americans and the Hard Livings,Controlled discreetly by South African Mafia Aziz Rasool aka Moonshie.  These gangs function as umbrella organisations for many smaller gangs that are allied with the two super gangs.  Smaller gangs in Cape Town that might be allied to one of the two larger umbrella gangs include Young Dixie Boys, Clever Kids, Naughty Boys, the Junky Funky Kids, Respectable Peacefuls, Wonder Kids, School Boys and Yuru Cats.

Prison gangs 

Prison gangs in South Africa consist mostly of the Numbers Gangs discovered in the province of KwaZulu-Natal, a grouping of prison based gangs named after the different numbers they are named after; namely the 26s, 27s, and 28s.  These gangs tend to be highly structured with strong hierarchical command structures and high levels of organization.

See also

References 

 
Crime in South Africa